Travis Parrott and Filip Polášek were the defending champions, but they chose to participate with different partners.

Parrott partnered up with Rohan Bopanna, but they lost in the first round against Colin Fleming and Ken Skupski, who eventually went on to beat Jérémy Chardy and Richard Gasquet in the final.

Seeds

Draw

External links
 Main Draw

St. Petersburg Open - Men's Doubles
St. Petersburg Open
2009 in Russian tennis